Bragi is the skaldic god of poetry in Norse mythology.

Etymology
The theonym Bragi probably stems from the masculine noun bragr, which can be translated in Old Norse as 'poetry' (cf. Icelandic bragur 'poem, melody, wise') or as 'the first, noblest' (cf. poetic Old Norse bragnar 'chiefs, men', bragningr 'king'). It is unclear whether the theonym semantically derives from the first meaning or the second.

A connection has been also suggested with the Old Norse bragarfull, the cup drunk in solemn occasions with the taking of vows. The word is usually taken to semantically derive from the second meaning of bragr ('first one, noblest'). A relation with the Old English term brego ('lord, prince') remains uncertain.

Bragi regularly appears as a personal name in Old Norse and Old Swedish sources, which according to linguist Jan de Vries might indicate the secondary character of the god's name.

Attestations

Snorri Sturluson writes in the Gylfaginning after describing Odin, Thor, and Baldr:

In Skáldskaparmál Snorri writes:

That Bragi is Odin's son is clearly mentioned only here and in some versions of a list of the sons of Odin (see Sons of Odin). But "wish-son" in stanza 16 of the Lokasenna could mean "Odin's son" and is translated by Hollander as Odin's kin. Bragi's mother is possibly the giantess Gunnlod. If Bragi's mother is Frigg, then Frigg is somewhat dismissive of Bragi in the Lokasenna in stanza 27 when Frigg complains that if she had a son in Ægir's hall as brave as Baldr then Loki would have to fight for his life.

In that poem Bragi at first forbids Loki to enter the hall but is overruled by Odin. Loki then gives a greeting to all gods and goddesses who are in the hall save to Bragi. Bragi generously offers his sword, horse, and an arm ring as peace gift but Loki only responds by accusing Bragi of cowardice, of being the most afraid to fight of any of the Æsir and Elves within the hall. Bragi responds that if they were outside the hall, he would have Loki's head, but Loki only repeats the accusation. When Bragi's wife Iðunn attempts to calm Bragi, Loki accuses her of embracing her brother's slayer, a reference to matters that have not survived. It may be that Bragi had slain Iðunn's brother.

A passage in the Poetic Edda poem Sigrdrífumál describes runes being graven on the sun, on the ear of one of the sun-horses and on the hoofs of the other, on Sleipnir's teeth, on bear's paw, on eagle's beak, on wolf's claw, and on several other things including on Bragi's tongue. Then the runes are shaved off and the shavings are mixed with mead and sent abroad so that Æsir have some, Elves have some, Vanir have some, and Men have some, these being speech runes and birth runes, ale runes, and magic runes. The meaning of this is obscure.

The first part of Snorri Sturluson's Skáldskaparmál is a dialogue between Ægir and Bragi about the nature of poetry, particularly skaldic poetry. Bragi tells the origin of the mead of poetry from the blood of Kvasir and how Odin obtained this mead. He then goes on to discuss various poetic metaphors known as kennings.

Snorri Sturluson clearly distinguishes the god Bragi from the mortal skald Bragi Boddason, whom he often mentions separately. The appearance of Bragi in the Lokasenna indicates that if these two Bragis were originally the same, they have become separated for that author also, or that chronology has become very muddled and Bragi Boddason has been relocated to mythological time. Compare the appearance of the Welsh Taliesin in the second branch of the Mabinogi. Legendary chronology sometimes does become muddled. Whether Bragi the god originally arose as a deified version of Bragi Boddason was much debated in the 19th century, especially by the scholars Eugen Mogk and Sophus Bugge. The debate remains undecided.

In the poem Eiríksmál Odin, in Valhalla, hears the coming of the dead Norwegian king Eric Bloodaxe and his host, and bids the heroes Sigmund and Sinfjötli rise to greet him. Bragi is then mentioned, questioning how Odin knows that it is Eric and why Odin has let such a king die. In the poem Hákonarmál, Hákon the Good is taken to Valhalla by the valkyrie Göndul and Odin sends Hermóðr and Bragi to greet him. In these poems Bragi could be either a god or a dead hero in Valhalla. Attempting to decide is further confused because Hermóðr also seems to be sometimes the name of a god and sometimes the name of a hero. That Bragi was also the first to speak to Loki in the Lokasenna as Loki attempted to enter the hall might be a parallel. It might have been useful and customary that a man of great eloquence and versed in poetry should greet those entering a hall. He is also depicted in tenth-century court poetry of helping to prepare Valhalla for new arrivals and welcoming the kings who have been slain in battle to the hall of Odin.

Skalds named Bragi

Bragi Boddason

In the Prose Edda Snorri Sturluson quotes many stanzas attributed to Bragi Boddason the old (Bragi Boddason inn gamli), a Norwegian court poet who served several Swedish kings, Ragnar Lodbrok, Östen Beli and Björn at Hauge who reigned in the first half of the 9th century. This Bragi was reckoned as the first skaldic poet, and was certainly the earliest skaldic poet then remembered by name whose verse survived in memory.

Snorri especially quotes passages from Bragi's Ragnarsdrápa, a poem supposedly composed in honor of the famous legendary Viking Ragnar Lodbrok ('Hairy-breeches') describing the images on a decorated shield which Ragnar had given to Bragi. The images included Thor's fishing for Jörmungandr, Gefjun's ploughing of Zealand from the soil of Sweden, the attack of Hamdir and Sorli against King Jörmunrekk, and the never-ending battle between Hedin and Högni.

Bragi son of Hálfdan the Old
Bragi son of Hálfdan the Old is mentioned only in the Skjáldskaparmál. This Bragi is the sixth of the second of two groups of nine sons fathered by King Hálfdan the Old on Alvig the Wise, daughter of King Eymund of Hólmgard. This second group of sons are all eponymous ancestors of legendary families of the north. Snorri says:
Bragi, from whom the Bragnings are sprung (that is the race of Hálfdan the Generous).
Of the Bragnings as a race and of Hálfdan the Generous nothing else is known. However, Bragning is often, like some others of these dynastic names, used in poetry as a general word for 'king' or 'ruler'.

Bragi Högnason
In the eddic poem Helgakviða Hundingsbana II, Bragi Högnason, his brother Dag, and his sister Sigrún were children of Högne, the king of East Götaland. The poem relates how Sigmund's son Helgi Hundingsbane agreed to take Sigrún daughter of Högni as his wife against her unwilling betrothal to Hodbrodd son of Granmar the king of Södermanland. In the subsequent battle of Frekastein (probably one of the 300 hill forts of Södermanland, as stein meant "hill fort") against Högni and Granmar, all the chieftains on Granmar's side are slain, including Bragi, except for Bragi's brother Dag.

In popular culture
Bragi is featured in the digital card game Mythgard (2019) as a mythic minion in the Norden faction, whose full name is Bragi Runesinger.

Bragi is portrayed by Dean O'Gorman in the New Zealand comedy The Almighty Johnsons.

In the 2002 Ensemble Studios game Age of Mythology, Bragi is one of nine minor gods Norse players can worship.

References

Bibliography

Further reading

 DuBois, Thomas A. Nordic Religions in the Viking Age. Philadelphia: University of Pennsylvania Press, 1999. .
 Dumézil, Georges. Gods of the Ancient Northmen. Berkeley: University of California Press, 1973. .
 Munch, P. A. Norse Mythology: Legends of Gods and Heroes. London: H. Milford, Oxford University Press, 1926.

External links 
 

Æsir
Knowledge gods
Norse gods
Arts gods